The International Journal of High Speed Electronics and Systems was established in 1990 and is published quarterly by World Scientific. It aims to "promote engineering education by advancing interdisciplinary science between electronics and systems and to explore high speed technology in photonics and electronics".

Abstracting and indexing 
The journal is abstracted and indexed in Inspec, Scopus and Compendex.

References

External links 
 

World Scientific academic journals
Publications established in 1990
English-language journals
Quarterly journals
Electronics journals
Semiconductor journals